Albert "Berten" Van Damme (born 1 December 1940) is a former Belgian cyclo-crosser. He won 109 individual races, became six times Belgian National Champion and once World Champion, in 1974. His career lasted from 1959 till 1978.

He was active in the same years as the brothers Eric and Roger De Vlaeminck. Together with his own brother, Daniël Van Damme there was a bit of a "battle" between the two families.

The first Albert Van Damme A-cyclocross race was held in October 2011 and was won by Sven Nys.

References

1940 births
Living people
Belgian male cyclists
Cyclo-cross cyclists
UCI Cyclo-cross World Champions (men)
Belgian cyclo-cross champions
Cyclists from East Flanders
People from Laarne